Doncourt-lès-Longuyon (literally Doncourt near Longuyon) is a commune in the Meurthe-et-Moselle department in north-eastern France.

History 

During World War I the forest of Doncourt became a training ground for the German Sturm-Bataillon Nr. 5 (Rohr) commanded by Willy Rohr. The German Emperor Wilhelm II visited Rohr and his battalion on 14 August 1916.

See also
Communes of the Meurthe-et-Moselle department

References

Doncourtleslonguyon